The Railroader is a 1919 American silent drama film directed by Colin Campbell and starring George Fawcett, Virginia True Boardman, and Frank Elliott.

Cast

References

Bibliography
 Donald W. McCaffrey & Christopher P. Jacobs. Guide to the Silent Years of American Cinema. Greenwood Publishing, 1999.

External links
 

1919 films
1919 drama films
1910s English-language films
American silent feature films
Silent American drama films
American black-and-white films
Films directed by Colin Campbell
Triangle Film Corporation films
1910s American films